Tillinghast may refer to:

 Tillinghast (surname), an English surname
 Tillinghast L'Hommedieu Huston (1867–1938), American businessman, owner of New York Yankees, circa 1915
 Tillinghast Mill Site, a Registered Historic Place in Rhode Island, United States
 Tillinghast Road Historic District, a Registered Historic Place in Rhode Island, United States
 Tillinghast Licht, a now defunct law firm in Rhode Island, United States
 Tillinghast, Nelson & Warren Inc., an American company that is now a part of Willis Towers Watson